Derawal Nagar is a neighbourhood in Delhi, India which is named after people of the Derawal community. Originally native to the Derajat region (districts of Dera Ismail Khan and Dera Ghazi Khan in present-day Pakistan). These individuals, who are mostly Hindu, were settled here after the partition of India in 1947.  It is just a small colony comprising two blocks A and B. It has a famous gurudwara of Shah Ji in A block. The language spoken by the original inhabitants of this area is Derawali, which is a dialect of Saraiki. Many of these Derawalis in Delhi have opened their dry fruit shops in Chandni Chowk. 

There are a number of Derewali Hindus living in Vijay Nagar, Ashok Vihar, Mukherjee Nagar and  Gurgaon

Some of these Derawali Hindus of Bhatia Clan have become accomplished businessmen in city of Surat. Bhatia Chemicals is a very well known & prominent large business. Bhatias in Surat and Ahemadabad also started Textile Factories such as Mohanlal And Sons Dyeing & Printing Mills in G.I.D.C. Pandesara, Surat, Gujarat. Manchanda, Sota, Nangia, Bangia, Arora, Malik, Gera, Kapoor apart from Bhatia are some prominent surnames in the area.

See also
 Dera Ghazi Khan
 Dera Ismail Khan
 Derajat
 Derawal
 Saraiki language
 Derawali dialect

References

Saraiki diaspora
Neighbourhoods in Delhi